The Saffron Palace is located in the Egyptian capital of Cairo, near Abbassia at Khalifa Maʽmon Road.
Now it is inside the main campus of the Ain Shams University.

History 
The Saffron Palace was an Egyptian royal palace. Farouk of Egypt is said to have been born in it.

The three-storey palace, designed by the French-educated Egyptian architect Moghri bey Saad, was built during the regime of Isma'il Pasha. It received its name from the saffron plantations which then existed around the palace. The Egyptian University's administrative offices were housed in the palace when it was founded in 1925. Important visitors were also hosted by the ministry of foreign affairs at the palace.

The Anglo-Egyptian treaty of 1936 was signed in the palace and, in March of 1945, the Arab League was founded there. 

In 1952, the palace became the administrative headquarters of Ain Shams University, which it remains to the present day.

See also
 List of palaces in Egypt

References

External links 

 The History of Zaafarama palace arabicnews.com 5/6/2005 

Palaces in Cairo
Ain Shams University